Destino de Mujer (English title: Destiny of a Woman) is a Venezuelan telenovela created by Mariela Romero and produced in 1997 as a joint production of Venevisión and Televisión Española. The telenovela lasted for 136 episodes and was distributed internationally by Venevisión International.

Sonya Smith and Jorge Reyes starred as the main protagonists with Yajaira Orta, Henry Galué, Tatiana Capote, Gabriela Vergara and Rafael Romero as antagonists.

Plot
A murder committed in the past marks the life of Mariana Oropeza and Víctor Manuel Santana, two young people who fall in love without knowing of the past that links them.

Years ago, Alfredo Oropeza killed Victor Manuel's father, stole his fortune and raped his fiancée, Aurora, whom he had always desired. After killing Esteban, Victor Manuel's father, the servants run for their lives together with his little brother Luis Miguel. But as they are being pursued by Alfredo's men, the nanny carrying Luis Miguel falls into a river. Traumatized and half naked, Aurora arrives at a Church calling for help. But her evil sister, Lucrecia, convinces her that everything that is happening was her fault, and has her locked up in a mental asylum. Nine months later, Aurora gives birth to a baby girl called Mariana, the product of her rape. Lucrecia takes away her niece and blackmails Alfredo—whom she has always loved—into marrying her.

Years later, Mariana and Víctor Manuel meet each other after they compete to win for an international business contract. They both cannot ignore the mutual attraction they feel for each other, until Víctor Manuel discovers that Mariana is the daughter of his worst enemy and the murderer of his father. Víctor Manuel decides to take revenge by seducing Mariana, but he cannot imagine that he will end up falling in love with her.

Cast

Main Cast
Sonya Smith as Mariana Oropeza Castillo
Jorge Reyes as Víctor Manuel Santana
Carlos Camacho as Luis Miguel Restrepo
Lupita Ferrer as Aurora Inés Acosta
Tatiana Capote as Griselda Ascanio 
Pedro Lander as Ramón Santana
Gabriela Vergara as Vanessa Medina
Rafael Romero as Rodolfo Anzola
Raúl Amundaray as Artemio Ruíz
Henry Galué as Alfredo Oropeza
Javier Valcárcel as Juan Félix

Supporting Cast

Yajaira Orta as Lucrecia Castillo de Oropeza
Carmen Julia Álvarez as Caridad Tovar
Chony Fuentes as Irma Santana
Alberto Álvarez as Humberto Maldonado
Pedro Martín as Izaguirre
María Eugenia Penagos as Margarita
Jalymar Salomon as Martha
Wanda D'Isidoro as Thaís Santana
Sonia Villamizar as Nereida Tovar
Carlos Baute as Pedro José
Yul Bürkle as Arnaldo
Roberto Messuti as Augusto Santana
Jeanette Flores as Mariana Salcedo
Roberto Lamarca as Ignacio
María Eugenia Penagos as Margarita
Ernesto Balzi
Alexis Escámez
Lucio Bueno
Mario Brito

Broadcasters

Trivia
This is the 3rd of the 4 telenovelas (Cristal, Rosangelica, Pecados Ajenos) that Sonya Smith and Lupita Ferrer worked together.
It was remade by Mexican TV network TV Azteca entitled Vuélveme A Querer, Sonya Smith also appeared here and she played the role as the heroine's mother.

References

External links

1997 telenovelas
1997 Spanish television series debuts
1997 Spanish television series endings
1997 Venezuelan television series debuts
1997 Venezuelan television series endings
1990s Spanish drama television series
Spanish television soap operas
Venezuelan telenovelas
Spanish-language telenovelas
Venevisión telenovelas
Televisión Española telenovelas
Spanish telenovelas
Television shows set in Venezuela